Aru (also Romanized as Ārū; also known as Kaleh-i-Aru) is a village in Boyer Ahmad-e Garmsiri Rural District, in the Central District of Gachsaran County, Kohgiluyeh and Boyer-Ahmad Province, Iran. At the 2006 census, its population was 884, in 187 families.

References 

Populated places in Gachsaran County